Takahiko Maruyama (born 14 November 1946) is a former sumo wrestler from Katsuyama, Fukuoka, Japan.  His highest rank was maegashira 13. He made his professional debut in May 1962 and reached the top division in May 1973. He had been injured during the previous tournament, withdrawing on Day 13 a day after getting his kachi-koshi or majority of wins. He was awarded kosho seido status for the next tournament, meaning he could miss it without effect on his rank. This made him not only the first wrestler ever to be awarded kosho status but also the first to obtain it in his top division debut. He entered the following tournament in July but scored only four wins against eleven losses and was demoted. He had one more tournament in makuuchi nearly three years later, in January 1976. He left the sumo world upon retirement from active competition in September 1976.

Career record

See also
Glossary of sumo terms
List of past sumo wrestlers
List of sumo tournament second division champions

References

1946 births
Living people
Japanese sumo wrestlers
Sumo people from Fukuoka Prefecture
Sumo wrestlers who use their birth name